Sunil Sikand is an Indian film director and son of veteran actor Pran. He directed his first film in 1984 called Farishta and second film in 1991 called Lakshmanrekha starring Jackie Shroff, Naseeruddin Shah, Shammi Kapoor, Danny Denzongpa and his father Pran.

Personal life

Sunil Sikand was married to Jyoti Sikand and they have one son Siddharth Sikand. The couple separated in 1982.

Filmography

References

External links 

Living people
20th-century Indian film directors
Film producers from Mumbai
Hindi-language film directors
Film directors from Mumbai
1949 births